= Biathlon at the 2007 Canada Games =

Biathlon was an event at the 2007 Canada Games, held at Grey Mountain in Whitehorse, Yukon. Due to cold weather conditions the pursuit event was cancelled and other events were modified with shorter courses to limit exposure.

== Relay ==
- The weather conditions were generally clear and cold. The wind was light. The relative humidity was 22%, the air temperature was −20 °C, and the snow temperature was −20 °C.

Medal	Junior Men's 3 x 7.5 km (Modified to 6 km)	Time (Penalty loops)	Junior Women's 3 x 6 km (Modified to 4.5 km)	Time (Penalty loops)
Gold	Alberta	57:37.40 (0)	Alberta	56:17.60 (1)
Silver	Quebec	1:00:18.10 (2)	Quebec	57:06.00 (6)
Bronze	Manitoba	1:11:45.80 (4)	Manitoba	1:05:47.60 (9)

== Sprint ==
- There were 36 entries in the Competition. Three did not finish and one was disqualified. The weather conditions were generally cold. The wind was gusty. The relative humidity was 22%, the air temperature was −20 °C, and the snow temperature was −20 °C.

Medal	Junior Men's 10 km (Modified to 9 km)	Time (Penalty loops)	Junior Women's 7.5 km (Modified to 6 km)	Time (Penalty loops)
Gold	(Alberta) Tyson Smith	32:45.5 (2)	(Alberta) Rosanna Crawford	24:28.5 (2)
Silver	(Alberta) Yannick Letailleur	33:20.7 (2)	(British Columbia) Jessica Sedlock	25:29.6 (1)
Bronze	(Quebec) Maxime Leboeuf	34:03.1 (4)	(Quebec) Claude Godbout	25:37.6 (3)

== Individual ==
- The weather conditions were generally cold. The wind was gusting. The relative humidity was 22%, the air temperature was −20 °C, and the snow temperature was −20 °C.

Medal	Junior Men's 15 km (Modified to 12.5 km)	Time (Penalty loops)	Junior Women's 12.5 km (Modified to 10 km)	Time (Penalty loops)
Gold	(Alberta) Tyson Smith	41:14.8 (6)	(Alberta) Rosanna Crawford	39:28.9 (6)
Silver	(Quebec) Maxime Leboeuf	41:35.3 (6)	(Quebec) Claude Godbout	41:17.7 (5)
Bronze	(Alberta) Yannick Letailleur	42:59.4 (8)	(Manitoba) Megan Imrie	41:18.6 (6)

== Pursuit ==
12.5km men's and 10km women's pursuit were cancelled due to extreme cold weather.
